Brackley Town was a railway station which served the Northamptonshire town of Brackley in England. It opened in 1850 as part of the Buckinghamshire Railway's branch line to Verney Junction which provided connections to Banbury, Bletchley and Oxford and closed in 1963.

History 
From 1899 until 1963, Brackley was served by two railway stations on different lines. Brackley Central - opened by the Great Central Railway - was the second, the Buckinghamshire Railway having already connected the town to the railway in 1850. As the Great Central's station was constructed at the top of the hill upon which Brackley is situated and Buckinghamshire Railway's station at the foot of the hill, locals referred to them respectively as the Top Station and the Bottom Station.

The Buckinghamshire Railway's station was built at the southern end of the main high street and was constructed of a yellow-grey coloured stone. A water tower for locomotives was positioned on the roof of a stone shelter situated on the up platform, slowly refilling from a nearby spring. The station's goods shed was built at a right angle to the line where a wagon turntable enabled vehicles to roll into the shed, aided by a slight gradient. A short spur on a severe gradient served the Hopkins and Norris brewery; horses drew the wagons up the gradient to allow them to be returned to the station yard by gravity. The spur (known locally as the "barrel line") fell into disuse in the early 1920s and the rails were lifted by 1935. The station's goods yard was not large, but was capable of accommodating the daily 3 to 12 wagons destined for the gasworks and the 4 to 5 wagons of malt and sugar for the brewery. A cattle dock could take four vans, and a 5-ton capacity crane was stationed in the yard.

The arrival of the Great Central in Brackley saw a great deal of trade ebb away from the branch. The Great Central provided a faster and more direct route to London; its station enjoyed seven trains a day from Marylebone, including an express which took 84 minutes, compared with the line's infrequent sparse service to Euston via Bletchley. The branch line was used to transport bricks for the construction of the Great Central's station, and a new siding was installed near the line's ten mile post.

On 13 May 1950 King George VI and Queen Elizabeth arrived at Brackley station en route to the first official British Grand Prix held at Silverstone. At the last minute it was discovered that the platform would be too low for the Royal Train's exit door and so an old wooden ammunition box had to be found and upended next to the door.

The station was renamed "Brackley Town" on 1 July 1950, but only for goods traffic. The goods yard and through freight traffic ceased on 2 December 1963, nearly three years after the last passenger service had called.

Routes

Present day 
All the station buildings have been demolished and the various parts of the site are now occupied by a new road (St. James Road), a grassed area, a police station, an industrial estate and residential housing. The station platforms and site of the goods yard survived until the early 1980s. The approach to the station from Brackley town passed in front of a row of cottages on Bridge Street, and the trackbed has been taken into their gardens. The bridge carrying the main road over the railway has been demolished and the road now crosses on the level. Elsewhere, the trackbed has been taken into Pocket Farm Walk, and a set of steps leading down to the old trackbed can be found at the end of St James Road; the line continues until it is severed by the A43 Brackley Bypass.

References

Sources

External links 
 Image of the station site
 Brackley station on navigable 1946 O. S. map
 Brackley station on Disused Stations

Disused railway stations in Northamptonshire
Former London and North Western Railway stations
Railway stations in Great Britain opened in 1850
Railway stations in Great Britain closed in 1963
Brackley